Coenonympha mahometana is a species of butterfly in the family Nymphalidae. It is found in parts of the Tian-Shan region, mainly Kyrgyzstan, Kazakhstan, and western China. It can be found in various humid habitats from grassy fields along streams at foothills (1200–1700 m) to humid alpine meadows (3500–3700 m)

Flight period
The species is univoltine and is on wing between June and July, depending on altitude and locality.

Food plants
Larvae feed on grasses.

References

Sources
Species info
BioLib.cz
Guide to the Butterflies of Russia and Adjacent Territories Volume 1. Pensoft, Sofia - Moscow. 1997.

Coenonympha
Butterflies described in 1881
Butterflies of Asia